Among My Swan is the third studio album by American band Mazzy Star, released on October 29, 1996.  Although Among My Swan did not contain any US Billboard Hot 100 hits like its predecessor, So Tonight That I Might See, this album garnered the band its highest-ranking single on the UK Singles Chart, when "Flowers in December" reached No. 40 in November 1996.

Among My Swan relied less on the echo effect that was nearly ubiquitous in all tracks on the previous two albums. Hope Sandoval's voice is paired with simple acoustic instrumentation that marks most of the tracks. The guitar and harmonica accompaniment on "I've Been Let Down" is an explicit example of this. These tracks are not markedly different in sound or feel from the preceding two albums.

"Flowers in December", "Disappear", "Happy" and "I've Been Let Down" were all released as singles from the album. Following the release of "I've Been Let Down" in 1997, Mazzy Star went on hiatus, and did not release new music until the single "Common Burn"/"Lay Myself Down" in 2011.

Release and promotion
The band opted to eschew mainstream promotion for the record, with Capitol Records taking what they described as a "long-term approach" towards its marketing. An outtake from the album, "Tell Me Now", appeared on the soundtrack to Batman Forever in 1995, while album track "Rhymes of an Hour" featured on the soundtrack to Stealing Beauty prior to the album's release. A senior marketing director at Capitol called Mazzy Star "the quintessential artist-development band. David and Hope are artists. Every album they make is a work of art"; Billboard noted that both films "nicely bookend Mazzy Star's demographic, with Batman Forever appealing to the collegiate crowd and the critically acclaimed, art-house Stealing Beauty skewing toward the band's baby boomer fans."

Music stores were given advance copies of the album from early September; the label conducted a contest where the store which best promoted the album would be rewarded with a live performance from the band. The entire album was serviced to college radio on October 7, and lead single "Flowers in December" was issued to Alternative and Triple-A stations the following week. The duo appeared on the October 1996 cover of Alternative Press, and a music video for "Flowers in December" was completed that same month. The song remains the duo's only song to enter the top forty of the UK Singles Chart. "I've Been Let Down" was scheduled to be issued as the album's second commercial single in the spring of 1997, but was released solely as a limited edition 7" vinyl in October 1996 as a double A-side with album track "Roseblood".

Commercial performance
The album peaked at number 67 on the Billboard 200. As of 2001, it has sold over 214,000 copies in the United States.

Track listing

Personnel

Musicians
 David Roback – guitars, keyboard, songwriter, producer, audio engineering, album design
 Hope Sandoval – vocals, harmonica, percussion, songwriter, co-producer, album design
 William Cooper – strings, audio engineering
 Jill Emery – bass
 Keith Mitchell – drums
 William Reid – additional guitar on "Take Everything"
 Aaron Sherer – drums on "Take Everything" and "Still Cold"

Production
 Beth Herschaft – photography
 Eddy Schreyer – mastering
 Dale Everingham – engineer
 Tom Cashen – production crew

Usage in media
"Happy", "All Your Sisters", and "Look on Down from the Bridge" are featured in the 2005 film Down in the Valley.

"Look on Down from the Bridge" is featured during a funeral scene and over the end credits of the 1999 The Sopranos episode "Meadowlands", in the 2011 film Texas Killing Fields, and when the title characters bury their dead alternative-dimension selves in the 2014 Rick and Morty episode "Rick Potion No. 9".

Charts

References

Notes

Citations

Mazzy Star albums
1996 albums
Capitol Records albums